Rhandirmwyn (or Rhandir-mwyn) is a small village in the north east of Carmarthenshire, Wales. Located in the upper Towy valley, 3 km north of Cilycwm village, it extends on both sides of the river. It lies in the parish of Llanfair-ar-y-bryn.

The Nantymwyn Lead Mine, above the village, was in existence since Roman times, and closed in 1932. Tourism is now the main industry.

The village is also the location of Coleg Elidyr.

The Pwllpriddog Oak stands nearby.

References

External links 
 Rhandirmwyn home page
 

Villages in Carmarthenshire